Bluefire Reader is an e-book reader application for Android (superseded by Cloudshelf Reader), iOS and Windows operating systems that supports white-labelling. It supports the EPUB and PDF formats for digital publications and incorporates facilities for browsing online catalogs, and downloading them directly into the user's personal library. The application features a library that lets users navigate their collection of eBooks, as well as provides a customizable reading experience through configurable font and background color, font size and type, margin size, display brightness, page turn mode, etc. Additionally, the application allows users to import their own books to read them on the go.

Features
 In-app browsing and downloading capability
 Read detailed descriptions before purchase & download
 Adjust front, background, link, layout & text alignment
 Day/Night themes: switch between day/night mode when reading in high/low-luminosity areas
 Brightness Control
 Customizable navigation modes
 Full support for Table of Contents
 Bookmarks: allows users to create their own bookmarks anywhere in a book to remember sections of interest
 Progress: allows users to check their reading progress in a chapter and in a book
 Share: allows users to recommend books to others via email, Facebook, Twitter, SMS...
 The reading engine automatically adjusts to the size of the device’s display 
 Library management: books can be organized by Collections 
 Edit detailed book information (title, author, tag, collection, rating)
 Sort books by title, author, download late, last read date or rating 
 Import: allows users to import their own books to read them on the go
 Open images within a book in a separate viewer
 Open links within a book on browser 
 Full text search: allows users to search any word globally within a book
 Dictionary lookup: allows users to look up any word definition in an online dictionary using Google define.
 Option to lock display orientation on iOS
 Option to set text alignment to left, justify or right
 Go To: allows users to quickly access any position within a book
 Support for Adobe DRM

References

External links
Bluefirereader.com, Bluefire Reader's official website
Bluefire Cloudshelf Reader, Google Play Store Link (Free)
iOS App Store Link

See also
Bluefire jellyfish

EPUB readers
Android (operating system) software